Alamosa Photovoltaic Power Plant, is a 7.7 MWAC (8.2 MWp) photovoltaic power station located in San Luis Valley, Colorado.  The facility was the largest in the United States to service a major public utility when its activation was announced on December 17, 2007.  It was the second largest plant after the U.S. Air Force's Nellis Solar Power Plant which was inaugurated the same day.  The electricity is being sold to Public Service of Colorado, a subsidiary of Xcel Energy, under a 20-year power purchase agreement.

Facility details
 
The plant occupies 82 acres of a 160 acre parcel of land adjacent to Highway 17 and existing transmission infrastructure near the community of Mosca.  It was originally constructed as three units to evaluate and demonstrate three types of photovoltaic (PV) technology at utility-scale, including: 1) fixed-tilt, seasonally-adjustable, flat-panel PV; 2) single-axis-tracking, flat-panel PV; and 3) dual-axis-tracking, concentrator photovoltaics (CPV).  The first two units account for about 6.8 MW of the plant capacity and use 2,224 and 24,384 Suntech polycrystalline silicon panels, respectively.   The third unit accounts for the remaining ~1.2 MW and consists of 72 SOLON Mover tracker systems with concentrating solar panels.

The plant was developed, financed, constructed, owned, and operated by SunEdison.   Construction began in April 2007,  and the facility was generating full power by the end of the year.   It continued as the most productive public-utility-connected PV power plant until the end of 2008,  when the El Dorado Solar Power Plant in Nevada came online.  It provided enough power to supply 1400 homes that year.  In January 2015, the plant was purchased by TerraForm Power,  which was created as a yield co by SunEdison prior to its bankruptcy filing the following year.

The plant received some criticism upon startup, saying that the amount of land used is large in comparison to the amount of power generated.

Electricity production

See also

 Greater Sandhill Solar Plant
 Solar power in Colorado
 Solar power in the United States
 Renewable energy in the United States
 Renewable portfolio standard

References

Buildings and structures in Alamosa County, Colorado
Photovoltaic power stations in Colorado
Photovoltaic power stations in the United States
Energy infrastructure completed in 2007